Ivonne Liliana Álvarez García (born 25 April 1978) is a Mexican politician affiliated with the Institutional Revolutionary Party (PRI). In 2012 she was elected to serve as a Senator of the LXII Legislature of the Mexican Congress representing Nuevo León. She was also Municipal President of Guadalupe, Nuevo León, and has been widely criticized for not fulfilling her term to seek a position in the senate; Álvarez publicly promised during her campaign not to do this.  In the 2018 general elections she secured a seat in the lower house of the Mexican congress.

Before becoming a politician, she worked as hostess of a television show called Música Grupera for Multimedios.
In January 2015 she was designated the PRI candidate for the 2015 Nuevo León gubernatorial election.

References

1978 births
Living people
Politicians from Monterrey
Members of the Senate of the Republic (Mexico)
Institutional Revolutionary Party politicians
21st-century Mexican politicians
Autonomous University of Nuevo León alumni
Members of the Congress of Nuevo León
Municipal presidents in Nuevo León
21st-century Mexican women politicians
Senators of the LXII and LXIII Legislatures of Mexico
Women members of the Senate of the Republic (Mexico)